"One Less Bell to Answer" is a song written by Burt Bacharach and Hal David. Originally written in 1967 for Keely Smith, the song was rediscovered in late 1969 by Bones Howe, the producer for the 5th Dimension, and the song was included on the group's 1970 debut album for Bell Records, Portrait. Lead vocals on the single were sung by Marilyn McCoo.

"One Less Bell to Answer"  was a platinum record. The song reached number two on the Billboard Hot 100 chart, behind "My Sweet Lord" by George Harrison. On other US charts, it went to number one on the Adult Contemporary chart, as well as No. 4 on the Best Selling Soul Singles chart.

Personnel
According to the AFM contract sheets, the following musicians played on the track.

Hal Blaine
Bones Howe
Larry Knechtel
Joe Osborn
Tommy Tedesco
Gary Illingworth
Fred Tackett
Jimmy Rowles
Robert Alcivar
Bill Holman
Sid Sharp
William Kurasch
Ralph Schaeffer
Arnold Belnick
Assa Drori
Tibor Zelig
Bernard Kundell
Henry Ferber
Robert Konrad
Bud Shank
Jim Horn
Emil Richards
William Hinshaw
Jim Decker
Richard Perissi

Chart history

Weekly charts

Year-end charts

Use in media
The 5th Dimension version of the song was prominently featured at the same time in an episode of the Robert Wagner TV series It Takes a Thief.

Other versions
Bacharach himself included a version of it as the closing number, with Cissy Houston singing, on his own 1971 eponymous A&M album.

Rosemary Clooney had a national easy listening chart record of this song in 1968 (US #34). Barbra Streisand partially covered the song in the medley "One Less Bell to Answer/A House Is Not a Home" on her 1971 album Barbra Joan Streisand. Also in 1971, Rita Reys recorded the song for her album Rita Reys Sings Burt Bacharach, which won her an Edison Award. Dionne Warwick recorded a version of the song on her 1972 Warner Bros. album Dionne; Bacharach and David produced their track for Warwick. Another 1972 cover was by Shirley Bassey on her album I Capricorn. Vikki Carr, Michael Ball, Vanessa Williams from Everlasting Love (2005), Trijntje Oosterhuis, and Sheryl Crow also have performed covers, and the song (specifically the Streisand medley version) was performed by Matthew Morrison and Kristin Chenoweth in an episode of the American television series Glee. In 2012 Steps covered the song on their album Light Up the World.

See also
List of number-one adult contemporary singles of 1971 (U.S.)

References

External links
 

1967 songs
1970 singles
The 5th Dimension songs
Songs with music by Burt Bacharach
Songs with lyrics by Hal David
Songs about loneliness
Torch songs
Bell Records singles